Peter Solnička (born 14 June 1982) is a Slovak professional footballer who currently plays for the Corgoň Liga club Spartak Myjava.

Spartak Myjava
He made his Corgoň Liga debut for Spartak Myjava against MŠK Žilina on 13 July 2012.

External links
Spartak Myjava profile

References

1982 births
Living people
Slovak footballers
Association football goalkeepers
Spartak Myjava players
Slovak Super Liga players